Camouflage is an album by Acoustic Ladyland that was recorded in October 2003 and released by Babel Label in 2004. It was the band's first album.

Reception

The Penguin Guide to Jazz wrote that "The pieces are cleverly orchestrated, Cawley doctoring his piano to make it work like electric guitar [...] while Rochford plays anything other than straight jazz time." John Fordham noted a Jimi Hendrix influence and commented "Hendrix inspiration or no, it doesn't really catch Hendrix's fire, and its themes and ensembles are less memorable than those of Babel's Polar Bear quartet, which also features Rochford, Wareham and Herbert."

Track listing
 "Some Other Sky"
 "Marching Dice"
 "Something Beautiful"
 "Routinely Denied (No Return)"
 "Nagel"
 "Remote Impression"
 "Little Miss Wingate"
 "Brave Reply"

References

2004 albums
Acoustic Ladyland albums
Babel Label albums